The Bellarmine Knights baseball team is the varsity intercollegiate athletic team of the Bellarmine University in Louisville, Kentucky, United States. The team competes in the National Collegiate Athletic Association's Division I and are members of the ASUN Conference.

The Knights have been to 0 NCAA Tournaments.

Stadiums

Knights Field

Knights Field is a baseball stadium in Louisville, Kentucky. It is the home stadium of the Bellarmine University Knights college baseball team since 1954.

Head coaches

Player awards

Great Lakes Valley Conference award winners

Player of the Year Award
Zac Wiley (2019)
Austin Crutcher (2015)
Patrick Brady (2008)
Scott Wiegandt (1989)
Pitcher of the Year
Eddie Mathis (2018)
Hunter Spencer (2016)
Michael Thompson (2009)

Freshman of the Year Award
Steve Polio (2002)

ASUN Conference award winners

Player of the Year Award
Matt Higgins (2022)

References

External links